Dummy is the debut studio album by English electronic music band Portishead, released on 22 August 1994 by Go! Beat Records.

The album received critical acclaim and won the 1995 Mercury Music Prize. It is often credited with popularising the trip hop genre, and is frequently cited in lists of the best albums of the 1990s. Dummy was certified triple platinum in the UK in February 2019, and had sold 920,000 copies in the United Kingdom as of September 2020. Worldwide, the album had sold 3.6 million copies by 2008.

Background
Geoff Barrow and Beth Gibbons met during an Enterprise Allowance course in February 1991. They started recording their first ideas for the songs in Neneh Cherry's kitchen in London while Barrow was hired by her husband Cameron McVey to work on her second album, Homebrew (1992). In Bristol, they recorded at the Coach House Studios. The first song that they finished for the album was "It Could Be Sweet" in 1991. Adrian Utley then met Barrow while they were recording at Coach House Studios, heard their first recorded track "It Could Be Sweet", and started exchanging ideas on music. Barrow taught Utley sampling while Utley introduced the band to unusual sounds such as cimbaloms and theremins, which led to an "amalgamation of ideas".<ref name=guardian>{{cite news |last=Rogers |first=Jude |author-link=Jude Rogers |url=https://www.theguardian.com/music/2019/aug/24/portishead-dummy-wasnt-a-chillout-album-25th-anniversary-geoff-barrow-adrian-utley-beth-gibbons |title=Dummy wasn't a chillout album. Portishead had more in common with Nirvana' |newspaper=The Observer |date=24 August 2019}}</ref> According to Barrow, "It was like a light-bulb coming on" when Utley joined them, and they realised they could make their own samples not found on other records, and created one of the most distinctive sounds of the decade.

The production of the album uses a number of hip-hop techniques, such as sampling, scratching, and loop-making. The album was not recorded digitally. They sampled music from other records, but they also recorded their own original music, which was then recorded onto vinyl records before manipulating them on record decks to sample. In order to create a vintage sound, Barrow said that they distressed the vinyl records they had recorded by "putting them on the studio floor and walking across them and using them like skateboards", and they also recorded the sound through a broken amplifier. For the track "Sour Times", the album samples Lalo Schifrin's "The Danube Incident" and Smokey Brooks' (Henry Brooks, Otis Turner) "Spin It Jig"; for "Strangers", Weather Report's (Wayne Shorter) "Elegant People"; for "Wandering Star", War's "Magic Mountain"; for "Biscuit", Johnnie Ray's "I'll Never Fall in Love Again" (not the Bacharach/David song); and for "Glory Box", Isaac Hayes' "Ike's Rap II".Dummy was released in August 1994. It helped to cement the reputation of Bristol as the capital of trip hop, a nascent genre which was then often referred to simply as "the Bristol sound".

The cover of the album is a still image of vocalist Beth Gibbons taken from To Kill a Dead Man—the short film that the band created—for which the self-composed soundtrack earned the band its record contract.

Singles
The first song released from the album was "Numb". Two further singles were released from the album: "Glory Box", which reached number 13 on the UK Singles Chart; and "Sour Times", which was released before "Glory Box" but re-released after the success of "Glory Box", also reaching number 13 on its re-release in 1995. The success of both singles drove the sales of the album, which eventually reached number two on the UK Albums Chart. "Sour Times" achieved moderate success in the U.S., reaching peak positions of number five and number 53 on the Billboard Alternative Songs and Hot 100 charts, respectively, in February 1995. On 3 December 2008, Universal Music Japan released Dummy and Portishead as limited SHM-CD versions.

The tracks "Roads" and "Strangers" were used in the soundtrack of the film Nadja.

Critical reception

Upon release, Dummy received universal acclaim from critics. NME summed up the record by writing: "This is, without question, a sublime debut album. But so very, very sad." It observed, "From one angle, its languid slowbeat blues clearly occupy similar terrain to soulmates Massive Attack and all of Bristol hip-hop's extended family. But from another these are avant garde ambient moonscapes of a ferociously experimental nature." The review concluded that "Portishead's post-ambient, timelessly organic blues are probably too left-field, introspective and downright Bristolian to grab short-term glory as some kind of Next Big Thing. But remember what radical departures Blue Lines, Ambient Works and Debut were for their times and make sure you hear this unmissable album." Melody Maker stated that the band "were undeniably the classiest, coolest thing to have appeared in the country for years ... Dummy, their debut, takes perfectly understated blues, funk and rap/hip hop, brackets all this in urban angst and then chills it to the bone." The review described the record as "musique noire for a movie not yet made, a perfect, creamy mix of ice-cool and infra-heat that is desperate, desolate and driven by a huge emotional hunger, but also warmly confiding ... Most of us waver hopelessly between emotional timidity and temerity the whole of our lives and Dummy marks out that territory perfectly." Tim Marsh of Select wrote: "Jumbling up hip hop, blues, jazz, dub and John Barry-esque TV theme tunes with the edgy lyrics and valium vocals of Beth Gibbons, it's lounge music for arty schizos."Q described Dummy as "perhaps the year's most stunning debut album" and proclaimed that "the singer's frail, wounded-sparrow vocals and Barrow's mastery of jazz-sensitive soul/hip hop grooves and the almost forgotten art of scratching are an enthralling combination". Mojo said that "Portishead make music for an early evening drinks party on the set of The Third Man. There is nothing kitschy about them either ... Beth Gibbons' voice has a genuine chill to it, and Geoff Barrow's background soundscapes are worthy of Lalo Schiffrin and Nellee Hooper." Rolling Stone wrote: "From tape loops and live strings, Fender Rhodes riffing and angelic singing, these English subversives construct très hip Gothic hip-hop ... Assertive rhythms and quirky production, however, save Portishead from languishing in any cosy retro groove. Instead they manage yet another – very smart – rebirth of cool.'

In the Pazz & Jop, polling prominent American critics nationwide, Dummy was voted the 14th best album of 1994. The poll's supervisor Robert Christgau, however, remained relatively lukewarm, highlighting "Sour Times" and "Wandering Star" while briefly appraising the album overall as "Sade for androids".

Retrospective reviews of the album have praised it highly. AllMusic wrote: "Portishead's album debut is a brilliant, surprisingly natural synthesis of claustrophobic spy soundtracks, dark breakbeats inspired by frontman Geoff Barrow's love of hip-hop, and a vocalist (Beth Gibbons) in the classic confessional singer/songwriter mold ... Better than any album before it, Dummy merged the pinpoint-precise productions of the dance world with pop hallmarks like great songwriting and excellent vocal performances." A BBC Music review in 2015 called it "quite simply one of the greatest debut albums of the 1990s" and said that "the constituents that make up much of this collection are easily traced – back to dub, to soul, and especially to hip hop; the array of scratch effects, loops and samples ... But it's the manner in which the pieces come together that makes Dummy special to this day ... Imitators have come and gone, but no act has reproduced the disquieting magnificence conjured here except Portishead themselves." Writing for Pitchfork in 2017, Philip Sherburne summarised that "Portishead's 1994 debut is a masterwork of downbeat and desperation. They invented their own kind of virtuosity, one that encompassed musicianship, technology, and aura."

AccoladesDummy won the 1995 Mercury Music Prize, beating stiff competition which included PJ Harvey's To Bring You My Love, Oasis' Definitely Maybe, and Tricky's Maxinquaye.Melody Maker - ranked number one album of the yearMojo (p. 62) – Ranked No. 35 in Mojo's "100 Modern Classics".Mojo (January 1995, p. 50) – Included in Mojo's "25 Best Albums of 1994".The New York Times (5 January 1995, p. C15) – Included on Neil Strauss' list of the Top 10 Albums of '94.NME (8 December 2000, p. 29) – Ranked No. 29 in The NME "Top 30 Heartbreak Albums".NME (24 December 1994, p. 22) – Ranked No. 6 in NMEs list of the "Top 50 Albums of 1994".
NME (October 2013, p. 59) – Ranked No. 168 in [[NME's The 500 Greatest Albums of All Time|NME'''s list of the '500 Greatest Albums of all time']].Q (December 1999, p. 82) – Included in Q Magazine's "90 Best Albums of the 1990s".Q (June 2000, p. 66) – Ranked No. 61 in Q's "100 Greatest British Albums".
In 2000 it was voted number 41 in Colin Larkin's All Time Top 1000 Albums.Rolling Stone (13 May 1999, pp. 79–80) – Included in Rolling Stones "Essential Recordings of the 90's".
In 2003 and 2012, the album was ranked number 419 on Rolling Stone magazine's list of the 500 greatest albums of all time. In their 2020 revised edition of the list, Dummy was placed at number 131.
Spin (September 1999, p. 140) – Ranked No. 42 in Spin Magazine's "90 Greatest Albums of the '90s".
In 2003, Pitchfork ranked the album number 48 in their "Top 100 Albums of the 1990s" list. In their revised 2022 list, Pitchfork named the album #11.
In 2015 Fact placed the album at No. 2 in their "50 Best Trip Hop Albums" list.
The album was also included in the book 1001 Albums You Must Hear Before You Die.
The Wire named Dummy its 1994 record of the year.
The album is the subject of a title in Continuum's 33⅓ series of books, published in October 2011.

Track listing

PersonnelPortishead Beth Gibbons – vocals (all tracks), production
 Geoff Barrow – Rhodes piano (tracks 1, 3, 4, 10), drums (tracks 6, 7), programming (tracks 2, 5, 7–9, 11), string arrangements (track 8), production
 Adrian Utley – guitar (tracks 1–3, 5, 8, 11), bass guitar (tracks 6, 7, 8, 9), theremin (track 1), Hammond organ (track 11), string arrangements (track 8), productionAdditional musicians Clive Deamer – drums (tracks 1, 3, 5, 7, 8, 9, 10)
 Gary Baldwin – Hammond organ (tracks 5, 6, 7)
 Neil Solman – Rhodes piano (tracks 2, 8), Hammond organ (track 2)
 Richard Newell – drum programming (track 4)
 Andy Hague – trumpet (track 9)
 Dave McDonald — nose flute (track 8)
 Strings Unlimited – strings (track 8)Technical personnel Dave McDonald – engineeringSamples'''
 Johnnie Ray – sample of "I'll Never Fall in Love Again" on "Biscuit"
 Isaac Hayes – sample of "Ike's Rap II" on "Glory Box"
 Lalo Schifrin – sample of "The Danube Incident" on "Sour Times"
 Smokey Brooks – sample of "Spin It Jig" on "Sour Times"
 Weather Report – sample of "Elegant People" on "Strangers"
 War – samples of "Magic Mountain" on "Wandering Star"

Charts

Weekly charts

Year-end charts

Certifications and sales

References

External links
Geoff Barrow interview
 The Bristol Sound

1994 debut albums
Albums produced by Geoff Barrow
London Records albums
Mercury Prize-winning albums
Portishead (band) albums